{{DISPLAYTITLE:C15H22O}}
The molecular formula C15H22O (molar mass: 218.33 g/mol, exact mass: 218.1671 u) may refer to:

 Cyperotundone
 Germacrone
 Mustakone
 Nootkatone
 Rotundone
 α-Vetivone

Molecular formulas